Johann Raithel (11 March 1897 – 29 January 1961) was a German general the Luftwaffe, who commanded the Kampfgeschwader 77 during World War II. He was a recipient of the Knight's Cross of the Iron Cross of Nazi Germany. 

On 1 April 1936, Raithel was tasked with the creation of Jagdgeschwader 132 "Richthofen" (JG 132—132nd Fighter Wing) and appointed its first Geschwaderkommodore (wing commander).

His daughter Anneliese married Hubert Greim, son of Generalfeldmarschall Robert Ritter von Greim.

Awards and decorations

 Knight's Cross of the Iron Cross on 17 October 1941 as Oberst and Geschwaderkommodore of Kampfgeschwader 77

Notes

References

Citations

Bibliography

 
 
 
 

1897 births
1961 deaths
Military personnel from Munich
People from the Kingdom of Bavaria
Luftwaffe World War II generals
Recipients of the clasp to the Iron Cross, 1st class
Recipients of the Knight's Cross of the Iron Cross
Lieutenant generals of the Luftwaffe